Nyasol, also known as cis-hinokiresinol or as (Z)-hinokiresinol, is a lignan that is found in Anemarrhena asphodeloides. It has estrogenic activity, acting as a selective agonist of the ERβ, and hence is a phytoestrogen. In addition, (-)-nyasol has been found to inhibit the production of eicosanoids and nitric oxide in vitro and shows anti-inflammatory effects.

References

Lignans
Phytoestrogens
Selective ERβ agonists